Quiero ser tu dueño (English: I Want to be Your Owner), is the second studio album by singer-songwriter Luis Coronel, released on September 30, 2014, by Del Records. Some of the songs were composed by Ernesto Chairez, José Davila, Luna Díaz, José Alfredo Iturbe Parra, and Coronel himself.  Quiero ser tu dueño became Coronel's first album to debut at number 1 on the Billboard Top Latin Albums chart in the United States.

Track listing

Charts

Weekly charts

Year-end charts

Sales and certifications

Awards and nominations

See also
 List of number-one Billboard Latin Albums from the 2010s

References 

2014 albums
Luis Coronel albums
Spanish-language albums